Taroko Bus is a bus company serving northern Hualien County, Taiwan. The company is founded in June, 2013, which became the first full-electric bus operator in Taiwan. At the beginning, it launched its first route no.301, which operates between Hualien Station and National Dong Hua University.

Rolling Stock

Aleees AEVB-A1S-2
Manufacturer: Alees 
Engine: Siemens
Manufactured in: 2014

Routes

References

External links
 

Taiwanese companies established in 2014
Bus transportation in Taiwan
Transport companies established in 2014
Transportation in Hualien County